Only Yesterday (subtitled Richard & Karen Carpenter's Greatest Hits) is a greatest hits compilation album by American group the Carpenters. It was released in 1990 by A&M Records and peaked at number one on the UK Albums Chart for seven weeks.

The album was released as Their Greatest Hits worldwide later in 1990, charting in several other countries and peaking at number one in New Zealand, also for seven weeks. This version has almost identical cover art except for the title as well as the addition of a sticker reading "20 Tracks, 76 Minutes Playing Time".

Track listing
"Yesterday Once More" (remix)
"Superstar" (remix)
"Rainy Days and Mondays" (remix)
"Top of the World" (single mix)
"Ticket to Ride"
"Goodbye to Love" (remix)
"This Masquerade"
"Hurting Each Other"
"Solitaire"
"We've Only Just Begun" (remix)
"Those Good Old Dreams"
"Please Mr. Postman"
"I Won't Last a Day Without You"
"Touch Me When We're Dancing"
"Jambalaya (On the Bayou)"
"For All We Know"
"All You Get from Love Is a Love Song"
"(They Long to Be) Close to You"
"Only Yesterday"
"Calling Occupants of Interplanetary Craft (The Recognised Anthem of World Contact Day)" (remix)

Chart performance

Certifications and sales

References

1990 albums